Freddi Fish 5: The Case of the Creature of Coral Cove is a 2001 video game and the fifth game in the Freddi Fish series of adventure games. It was developed by Humongous Entertainment and published by Infogrames.

Plot
Freddi and Luther visit Grandma Grouper on their way to Coral Cove Park. Grandma Grouper tells them to have fun and be safe. On the way, they run into an angry mob of Coral Cove citizens and the park's developer Marty Sardini, who are angry and terrified of the sea monster supposedly terrorizing the park. Freddi and Luther need to enter Coral Cove Park to find clues, but they are stopped by Officer Beverly, the guard, who says they need a permission slip signed from Mayor Marlin to be let in. At the Mayor's office, Freddi and Luther find that Mayor Marlin is being given a makeover by Clyde, the barber, who forgot his fin-pic at his barber shop. Clyde gives Freddi the keys to the barber shop so she and Luther can find it. After giving Clyde the right fin-pic, Clyde leaves and Freddi and Luther have the permission slip signed by the Mayor. The Officer then allows Freddi and Luther to enter Coral Cove Park and the duo goes to look for clues there.

After entering Coral Cove Park, Freddi and Luther find a food sample partially eaten by the sea monster and have it analyzed. As they swim off, Marty Sardini spies on the two, concerned that they might ruin his "grand plan", hinting that he is the true criminal. They enlist the help of Casey, a smart friend of theirs, to analyze it. After Freddi and Luther give him a pair of pliers or a lens to fix his microscope, Casey identifies the food as a type of "sea cheese" that is only found in Tetra Cave. He also gives Freddi and Luther a key he found with traces of the same food on it. The duo heads over to Tetra Cave and use the key to open its door. The cave is very dark, so Freddi uses a glowing necklace that she got from playing with a claw crane to light up the room.

In Tetra Cave, Freddi discovers a to-do list that the monster had, which includes picking up sea cheese, scaring the townspeople away from his home and lurking at the deepest crevice (or ordering 50 lbs. of taffy). After finding even more clues, Freddi and Luther head over to a deep crevice, where they meet the sea monster named Xamfear Duncan Dogberry Valentine. Xamfear says Coral Cove Park is his home and Marty kicked him out and turned his home into a tourist attraction, despite the fact that Xamfear had a deed to prove that he did own the cove.

Suddenly, Marty arrives with the townsfolk and denies there was any such deed. When Xamfear tries to find his deed, he realizes it's been stolen, and Marty disappears as well. Together, Freddi and Luther slip into Marty's base and after dodging traps, discover the stolen deed. Marty soon catches the two and threatens to have them arrested right when the Mayor and his townsfolk show up. Freddi and Luther clear Xamfear's name by showing the deed to everyone. Outraged, the mayor and the townsfolk turn on Marty and arrest him for theft and treason. 

In the end, Marty is stuck doing the dirty work, Freddi and Luther get the deed signed by Mayor Marlin, and the townsfolk celebrates when Xamfear allows them to play in the park. Freddi and Luther then swim out to the credits with Kipper with all characters on her computer.

Gameplay
The game uses the same principles as its predecessors, but the puzzles and sequences are straightforward as there are no multiple endings and choices like the previous two games. Uncommon to other Junior Adventure games, there is also a long, side-scrolling screen used to represent a town in the middle of the game world, with different buildings and characters to visit.

Reception

During 2001, Freddi Fish 5 sold 119,739 retail units in North America alone, according to PC Data.

Freddi Fish 5: The Case of the Creature of Coral Cove was generally well-received, getting scores of 7.5 out of 10 from IGN based on 1 review, a 4-star rating from Allgame, 5 Stars from macHOME, 4.5 stars from Review Corner, 3.5 stars from Adventure Gamers based on 1 review, 90% from Greenman Gaming and 5 Stars from Metzomagic. Review Corner also gave this game the Award of Excellence.

References

External links
 
 Freddi Fish 5: The Case of the Creature of Coral Cove at Humongous Entertainment

2001 video games
Adventure games
Humongous Entertainment games
Infogrames games
IOS games
Linux games
Classic Mac OS games
ScummVM-supported games
Video games featuring female protagonists
Windows games
Point-and-click adventure games
Video games developed in the United States
Single-player video games
Children's educational video games
Detective video games
Video games with underwater settings
Tommo games